The NM Institute Of Engineering and Technology (NMIET), Bhubaneswar is a technical institute affiliated with the Biju Patnaik University of Technology, Odisha, India. Since its establishment in the year 2004, it has evolved as the fastest growing technical college of Odisha. It is an ISO 9001 : 2001 Certified Institute.

References

External links

Engineering colleges in Odisha
Universities and colleges in Bhubaneswar
Science and technology in Bhubaneswar
Colleges affiliated with Biju Patnaik University of Technology
Educational institutions established in 2004
2004 establishments in Orissa